Rhodopteriana anaemica is a moth in the family Eupterotidae. It was described by George Hampson in 1910. It is found in Zambia.

References

Janinae
Moths described in 1910